The 2010 Weil Tennis Academy Challenger is a professional tennis tournament played on outdoor hard courts. It is part of the 2010 ATP Challenger Tour. It takes place in Ojai, California, United States between 31 May and 6 June 2010.

Singles main-draw entrants

Seeds

 Rankings are as of May 24, 2010.

Other entrants
The following players received wildcards into the singles main draw:
  Sekou Bangoura
  Steve Johnson
  Bobby Reynolds
  Donald Young

The following players received enty into the singles main draw as an alternate:
  Pierre-Ludovic Duclos

The following players received entry from the qualifying draw:
  Philip Bester
  Cecil Mamiit
  Nicholas Monroe
  Greg Ouellette

The following players received Lucky loser into the singles main draw:
  Dayne Kelly

Champions

Singles

 Bobby Reynolds def.  Marinko Matosevic, 3–6, 7–5, 7–5

Doubles

 Artem Sitak /  Leonardo Tavares def.  Harsh Mankad /  Izak van der Merwe, 4–6, 6–4, [10–8]

References
Italian Tennis Federation official website
ITF search

Weil Tennis Academy Challenger
Tennis tournaments in the United States